Ballou is a census-designated place (CDP) in Mayes County, Oklahoma, United States. As of the 2000 census, the CDP population was 142 people, a figure which increased to 176 in 2010.

Geography
Ballou is located at  (36.143676, -95.199410).

Demographics

As of the census of 2000, there were 142 people, 58 households, and 41 families residing in the CDP. The population density was 38.0 people per square mile (14.7/km2). There were 60 housing units at an average density of 16.1/sq mi (6.2/km2). The racial makeup of the CDP was 73.94% White, 19.01% Native American, and 7.04% from two or more races.

There were 58 households, out of which 19.0% had children under the age of 18 living with them, 62.1% were married couples living together, 5.2% had a female householder with no husband present, and 27.6% were non-families. 24.1% of all households were made up of individuals, and 8.6% had someone living alone who was 65 years of age or older. The average household size was 2.45 and the average family size was 2.93.

In the CDP, the population was spread out, with 18.3% under the age of 18, 10.6% from 18 to 24, 31.0% from 25 to 44, 28.2% from 45 to 64, and 12.0% who were 65 years of age or older. The median age was 40 years. For every 100 females, there were 140.7 males. For every 100 females age 18 and over, there were 118.9 males.

The median income for a household in the CDP was $27,321, and the median income for a family was $53,068. Males had a median income of $23,750 versus $50,455 for females. The per capita income for the CDP was $15,859. None of the population and none of the families were below the poverty line.

References

Census-designated places in Mayes County, Oklahoma
Census-designated places in Oklahoma